The TG4 Lifetime Achievement Award is given annually as part of Gradam Ceoil TG4. The award is to recognise a musician who has had a profound effect on the traditional Irish music world and promoted traditional music in a positive way.

The following is a list of the recipients of the award.

2001 – Paddy Canny, Co. Clare
2002 – Peter Horan, Co. Sligo
2003 – Johnny O'Leary, Co. Kerry
2004 – Tony MacMahon, Co. Clare
2005 – Peadar Ó Lochlainn, Co. Clare
2006 – Sarah Keane & Rita Keane, Co. Galway
2007 – Paddy Cronin, Co. Kerry
2008 – Joe O'Donovan & Siobhán O'Donovan, Co. Cork
2009 – Roger Sherlock, Co. Mayo
2010 – Seán Potts, Dublin
2011 – Ben Lennon, Co. Leitrim
2012 – Danny Meehan, Co. Donegal
2013 – Michael Tubridy, Co. Clare
2014 – Chris Droney, Co. Clare
2015 – Bobby Gardiner, Co. an Chláir
2016 – Arty McGlynn, Co. Tír Eoghan
2017 – Dónal Lunny, Co. Offaly
2018 – Patsy Hanly, Co. Roscommon
2019 – Nicky McAuliffe & Anne McAuliffe, Co. Kerry

References

Traditional music
Irish music awards
Lifetime achievement awards